Agafia Orlov-Buhaev-Constantin (born April 19, 1955) is a Romanian sprint canoer who competed from the mid-1970s to the early 1980s. Competing in three Summer Olympics, she won a gold medal in the K-4 500 m event at Los Angeles in 1984.

Constantin also won eight medals at the ICF Canoe Sprint World Championships with a silver (K-2 500 m: 1977) and seven bronzes (K-2 500 m: 1978, 1979, 1981; K-4 500 m: 1974, 1978, 1979, 1983).

References

1955 births
Living people
Canoeists at the 1976 Summer Olympics
Canoeists at the 1980 Summer Olympics
Canoeists at the 1984 Summer Olympics
Olympic canoeists of Romania
Olympic gold medalists for Romania
Romanian female canoeists
Olympic medalists in canoeing
ICF Canoe Sprint World Championships medalists in kayak
Medalists at the 1984 Summer Olympics